The Cradlesong Tour (stylized cradlesong tour) is the second solo concert tour by Matchbox Twenty frontman Rob Thomas. The tour supported his second studio album, Cradlesong and the digital EP, Someday EP. The tour primarily visited North America and Australia. During the summer of 2010, the tour morphed into the Sidewalk Angels Tour, benefiting the charity of the same name.

Background

After the success of his debut album ...Something to Be, Thomas rejoined his band for the release of their first greatest hits album and tour. In 2008, Thomas went back into the studio and began recording his next album. The tour began in the fall of 2009 in Arizona and continued into 2010 with a few dates in Australia. After a three-month hiatus, Thomas continued to tour into the summer of 2010. The tour, given the name "Sidewalk Angels Tour" benefited the Sidewalk Angels Foundation, created by Thomas’ wife, Marisol.
Thomas described the summer outing as an intimate performance allowing the songs to speak for themselves. He further states, "It's a chance for me, as a songwriter, to really highlight lyric and melody and to create different versions of songs that I’ve been playing for years. We’ll be doing my solo stuff, Matchbox Twenty songs and covers. It will be a real ‘Storytellers’ kind of vibe."

Opening acts
OneRepublic (North America—Leg 1)
Carolina Liar (North America—Leg 1)
Vanessa Amorosi (Australia)

Setlist

Additional notes
"Not Just a Woman" was performed at Hard Rock Live in Hollywood, Florida. It was also performed at the Coeur d'Alene Casino Resort Event Center in Worley, Idaho and the Event Center Arena in San Jose, California in lieu of "Hard on You".
 "3 A.M." was performed at the Hard Rock Live in Orlando, Florida in lieu of "Bent".
"Time After Time" was performed at the Ruth Eckerd Hall in Clearwater, Florida. It was also performed at the Coeur d'Alene Casino Resort Event Center in Worley, Idaho in lieu of "Jane Says"
A cover of U2's "Desire" was included in the performance at the Hard Rock Live in Orlando, Florida.
"Still Ain't Over You" was performed at the Ruth Eckerd Hall in Clearwater, Florida and the Koka Booth Amphitheatre in Cary, North Carolina in lieu of "Feel So Bad".
"When the Heartache Ends" was included in the performance at the Koka Booth Amphitheatre in Cary, North Carolina in lieu of "Hard on You".
At the Reno Events Center in Reno, Nevada, Thomas performed, "Wonderful" in lieu of "Hard on You. Also, "Mammas Don't Let Your Babies Grow Up to Be Cowboys" in lieu of "Bent".
During the performance at the Event Center Arena in San Jose, California, "Ain't No Sunshine" and "Voodoo Child (Slight Return)" replaced "Bent" and "Feel So Bad" respectively. 
At the Pearl Concert Theater in Las Vegas, Nevada, Thomas performed "Dancing in the Dark" in lieu of "Hard on You". Additionally, he performed "The Gambler" in lieu of "Gasoline". Also, "Baby Can I Hold You" and "One" replaced "Bent" and "Feel So Bad" respectively. 
At the Midland Theatre in Kansas City, Missouri, Thomas performed "Dear Joan" along with a cover of Modern English's I Melt With You in lieu of "Bent" and "Feel So Bad" respectively.
At the Beacon Theatre in New York City, New York, Thomas performed, "Voodoo Child (Slight Return)" and "Bright Lights" in lieu of "Bent" and "Feel So Bad" respectively.
For concerts performed during December 2009, Thomas performed "New York Christmas" in lieu of "Bent" and "Feel So Bad".
At the concert at Sandalford Wines Estate in Caversham, Western Australia, Australia, Thomas performed "Let's Dance".
"The Nearness of You and Just Like Heaven" were performed at the Casino Rama Entertainment Centre in Orilla, Ontario, Canada
A cover of "I Melt with You" and "Dizzy" (a song from Thomas' former band Tabitha's Secret) were performed the Seneca Niagara Events Center in Niagara Falls, New York in lieu of the medley. Additionally, "Bright Lights" was performed at this concert.
A cover of Matchbox Twenty's "The Difference" was performed in lieu of "When the Heartache Ends" at the Fantasy Springs Special Events Center in Indio, California.
Elton John's "Mona Lisas and Mad Hatters" was included in the performance at the Sandbar at Red Rock in Las Vegas, Nevada in lieu of "Save the Last Dance for Me".
Willie Nelson's "Crazy" was performed at the Coeur d'Alene Casino Resort Event Center in Worley in lieu of "Save the Last Dance for Me".
For the final performance at the Mohegan Sun Arena in Uncasville, Connecticut, Thomas performed "Dear Joan" in lieu of "Save the Last Dance for Me". Also, INXS' Never Tear Us Apart replaced "Jane Says".

Tour dates

Festivals and other miscellaneous performances

These concerts were a part of the "A Day on the Green Festival"
This event was a part of the "2010 Dick's Sporting Goods Open"
This event was a part of the "2010 Taste of Chicago"
This event was a part of the "2010 Universal Studios Orlando Summer Concert Series

Box office score data

Broadcasts and recordings
For the tour, Thomas' created USB wristbands that included highlights of songs from the tour. Fans were able to vote on the songs included on the wristbands. Entitled the "Best of…cradlesong tour", the USB included 30 songs from various concerts on the first North American  and Australian leg of the tour. An additional USB wristband was made available for the Sidewalk Angels tour.

References

2009 concert tours
2010 concert tours
Rob Thomas (musician) concert tours